Sinoseius pinnatus is a species of mite first found in Finland.

References

Ameroseiidae
Animals described in 2010